Mauricio Montalvo Samaniego: (born June 26, 1961) is serving as the Ecuadorian Minister of Foreign Affairs since 24  May 2021. He has an LLM from Harvard. He has served as ambassador to the UN in Geneva, in the Ecuadorian Mission to OAS, among others.

Biographical review 
In his university years, he became a Student Representative to the Academic Council of PUCE (1983) and President of the PUCE Law School Association (1984).

Later, he graduated as Doctor of Jurisprudence (1986), Lawyer (1986) and Bachelor of Legal Sciences (1984) from the Pontificia Universidad Católica del Ecuador (PUCE).

He holds a Master's Degree in Law (LL.M.) from Harvard University (1990) where he was a classmate of President Barack Obama.

Additionally, he has a Diploma in Public Administration from the National School of Administration (ENA) in Paris, France (2004).

He has been Professor at the Faculty of Jurisprudence of PUCE, the School of International Sciences of the Central University of Ecuador, the College of Jurisprudence of USFQ, the Faculty of Law and Social Sciences of the University of Las Américas (UDLA) and visiting professor at the School of Law of the University of Puerto Rico, in San Juan. Lecturer at IAEN, FLACSO, Universidad Andina, Academia de Guerra, Escuela Superior de Policia, among others. He has published several specialized articles on legal and international issues.

He has held various diplomatic functions. For example, in the Permanent Missions to OAS in Washington DC, to the UN in New York and to UNESCO in Paris, France. Moreover, he was Ambassador and Permanent Representative to the UN and other International Organizations in Geneva, Switzerland and served as Ambassador of Ecuador in Australia, with concurrence to New Zealand and [Fiji] before being named Ecuadorian Minister of Foreign Affairs by President Guillermo Lasso.

He has held various diplomatic missions. For example, in the Permanent Mission to OAS in Washington DC, to the UN in New York and to UNESCO in Paris, France. Moreover, he was the Ambassador and Permanent Representative to the UN and International Organizations in Geneva, Switzerland and served as the Ambassador of Ecuador to Australia, with concurrence to New Zealand and Fiji until May, 2021.

Distinctions 
 Grand Cross of the National Order of Merit of Chile
 Cavalieri of the Order of Solidarity of Italy

Charges and duties 
 Undersecretary of International Organizations
 Director General of Communication
 Director General of Multilateral Policy
 General Director of Border Relations with Colombia
 Secretary of the Advisory Board
 General Coordinator of the Ministry of Foreign Affairs
 General Summit Coordinator
 Multilateral Undersecretary
 Legal Advisor to the Presidency of the Republic
 Advisor to the Minister of Finance
 World Bank Consultant
 General Undersecretary of Public Administration
 Dean of the Faculty of Law and Social Sciences of the University of Las Américas (UDLA)

References

External links 

1961 births
Living people
People from Quito
École nationale d'administration alumni
Harvard University alumni
Ecuadorian diplomats
Ambassadors of Ecuador to Australia
Permanent Representatives of Ecuador to the United Nations
Foreign ministers of Ecuador